The Mk 47 or Striker 40 is a 40mm automatic grenade launcher with an integrated fire control system, capable of launching smart programmable 40mm air burst grenades in addition to various unguided rounds.

Design 

The Mk 47 has the latest sensing, targeting and ballistics technology. The Lightweight Video Sight produced by Raytheon, the Mk 47's fire control system, utilizes the latest in laser rangefinding, I2 night vision and ballistic computer technology.

In addition to being able to fire all NATO standard high-velocity 40mm rounds like the Mk 19 grenade launcher, it can fire MK285 smart grenades that can be programmed to air burst after a set distance. A computerized sight allows the user to set this distance.

Program timeline 
 July 2006: General Dynamics awarded $23 million contract for Mk 47 Mod 0 production. The award is part of a five-year Indefinite Delivery Indefinite Quantity contract with a total potential value of $82 million. Work will be completed at General Dynamics’ facility in Saco, Maine. General Dynamics is partnered with Raytheon (Dallas, Texas/Forest, Miss.) to build the Lightweight Video System (LVS) Fire Control. Program administration will be conducted at General Dynamics' Vermont-based Burlington Technology Center.
 February 2009: General Dynamics awarded $12 million contract for Mk 47 Mod 0 production.

Users

The US military and the Israel Defence Forces have fielded limited numbers of MK 47 Mod 0 systems, with approximately 1,500 in US service.

: Mk 47 Mod 1 Australian Defence Force $47 million contract for 200 designated Light Weight Automatic Grenade Launcher (LWAGL), to be delivered to the ADF from the third quarter of 2016 until mid 2017 to replace Mk-19. Fitted with the Lightweight Video Sight (LVS2) sighting system with integrated colour video and thermal imaging.
: Mk 47 Mod 0 Israel Defense Forces $24.9 million contract signed in 2010 for 130. Deliveries are scheduled to begin in January 2012 and be completed by August 2012 to replace Mk 19.
: Mk 47 Mod 0 US Special Operations Command (USSOCOM) units, including both Army and Navy, in service in Iraq and Afghanistan from 2006 designated the Advanced Lightweight Grenade Launcher (ALGL). Now being used by USSOCOM units in Syria.

See also 
 Comparison of automatic grenade launchers
 Ground Mobility Vehicle – (US)SOCOM program

References

External links 

  
 
 Defense-update.com Article on Mk-47
 Mk 47 Advanced Lightweight Grenade Launcher - Global Security
 Modern Firearms

40×53mm grenade launchers
Grenade launchers of the United States
Automatic grenade launchers
Military equipment introduced in the 2000s